Through the Eyes of a Killer is a 1992 American made-for-television thriller film starring Richard Dean Anderson and Marg Helgenberger.

Plot

A woman has a brief affair with the contractor (Richard Dean Anderson) who is renovating her apartment and he refuses to accept the end of their relationship.

Cast
 Marg Helgenberger as Laurie Fisher
 Richard Dean Anderson as Ray Bellano
 David Marshall Grant as Max Campbell
 Melinda Culea as Alison Rivers
 Tippi Hedren as Mrs. Bellano
 Joe Pantoliano as Jerry
 Monica Parker as Dorothy

External links
 

1992 television films
1992 films
1992 thriller films
CBS network films
Films directed by Peter Markle
Films scored by George S. Clinton
American thriller television films
1990s American films